Ampilatwatja is a small community in the Northern Territory of Australia located 325km northeast of Alice Springs. Ampilatwatja is administered by the Barkly Regional Council and is within the Utopia aboriginal homeland.
The community has a school and the Ampilatwatja Health Centre There have been ongoing infrastructure issues affecting the community for years, including water quality, internet and mobile access as well as road access issues.

Demographics
As of 2021 there were 515 people, with a median age of 24.  90.4% of residents were Aboriginal and/or Torres Strait Islander. There were 77 households and 82% spoke Alyawarr at home.

References 

Populated places in the Northern Territory
Barkly Region